The Dabgar  are a Hindu caste found in the states of Uttar Pradesh, Rajasthan and Gujarat in India. They were the follower of Shiva. According to their traditions, they were originally found in Rajasthan and were soldiers.  In Rajasthan, the community prefer to call themselves Dhalgar.

Origin

The word Dabgar is said to be derived from the Sanskrit word Daravakarra''. According to their traditions they were originally found in Rajasthan and were soldiers and originally of Rajput (Kshatriya) origin. They took an oath to resist the Mughals but were defeated. The rest of the community fled in the jungles of Bundelkhand, and slowly spread to the Doab region of Uttar Pradesh. 

Dabgar ancestry is of Rajput origin and were mainly soldiers by occupation and are found in the Marwad region. Dabgar are Kshatriya (क्षत्रिय) and their gotra is Kashyap. Kashyap Gotra comes under Kshatriya Varna. They speak the Marwari language but most understand Hindi. In Rajasthan, the community consist of three clans, the Chauhan, Rathore and Parmar. Each of these three clans is territorial, with the Chauhan found mainly in Jodhpur, Rathore in Udaipur and Parmar in Ajmer.

In Gujarat the Dabgar habitat was Pawagarh in the Baroda District. According to their traditions they fled Baroda as a consequence of a Muslim invasion and are now found mainly in the Dabgar and Sarnagpur districts of Ahmadabad. A small number are also found in Surat and Baroda. The Dabgar speak Gujarati and most also understand Hindi. All Dabgars connection are of from Rajasthan and their ancestry is of Rajput (Kshatriya) origin.

Present circumstances

The Dabgar of Uttar Pradesh are strictly endogamous, and practice clan exogamy. Their main clans are the Rajput, Delhiwal, Dari, Sripat and Kanaujiya. Theoretically, each clan descends from a common ancestor. They are Hindus, and their deity is Satyanarain.Uniquely,A small number of Dabgar also belong to the Nanakpanthi sect which is closely connected with Sikhism.

Like most Gujarati Hindu castes, they are strictly endogamous, and practice clan exogamy. Their main clans include Parmar, Rathore, Modi and Chaariwal. In neighbouring Rajasthan, the community consist of three clans, the Chauhan, Rathore and Parmar. Each of these three clans is territorial, with the Chauhan found mainly in Jodhpur, Deora in Udaipur and Parmar in Ajmer.

The Dabgar of Gujarat are Like other Gujaratis, many have also emigrated to East Africa and the United Kingdom. The Gujarat Dabgar are Hindu, and most are members of the Swaminarayan sect.

References

Social groups of Gujarat